Marco Paoloni (born 21 February 1984) is an Italian footballer who plays as a goalkeeper; he is currently suspended since his involvement in 2011 Italian football scandal.

Club career
Born in Civitavecchia, the Province of Rome, Paoloni started his career at A.S. Roma.

Teramo 
But in summer 2003, he left Roma's Primavera for Serie C1 side Teramo Calcio and played the last 4 matches of the 2003–04 season. In the next season, he was the first choice ahead Paolo Mancini until January.

Ternana
Paoloni was signed by Serie B side Ternana in co-ownership deal from Teramo in 2005, where he played as Tommaso Berni's backup, along with Lorenzo Bucchi. In June 2006, Teramo won the auction to bought back Paoloni 50% registration rights.

Ascoli
Paoloni was re-sold to Ascoli from Teramo in another co-ownership deal and signed a 3-year contract on 31 August. As part of the deal, Giovanni Amodeo also moved to Teramo in another co-ownership deal for undisclosed fee. Paoloni was loaned back to Teramo, where he remained as first choice.

That season Teramo finished 8th in Serie C1. In June 2007, Teramo gave up the remain rights to Ascoli and went bankrupt soon after. In 2007–08 season, he was the backup of Massimo Taibi. In August 2008, he mutually terminated his contract with Ascoli which would expire in June 2009,

Cremonese
Since terminated his contract with Ascoli, Paoloni joined Udinese Calcio on free transfer, which sent him to Cremonese in another co-ownership deal. At Cremona, Paoloni was Giorgio Bianchi's backup in first half of the season, but since January he was the first choice goalkeeper.

In June 2010, Cremonese bought him outright. In January 2011 he moved to Benevento in exchange for goalkeeper Gabriele Aldegani and forward Joelson.

Italian football scandal

On 1 June 2011, Paoloni was arrested following an investigation that showed he had poisoned his own team's water bottles in a failed attempt to throw a game against Paganese to settle outstanding gambling debts. Further investigation showed he had also worked as an agent for match fixers in games he was not personally involved in in Serie B and Lega Pro.  Italian FA (FIGC) subsequently issued him a 5-year ban; on 18 June 2012, the term was extended another 4 years.

International career
Paoloni capped for Italy U19 team at 2003 UEFA European Under-19 Football Championship, ahead Andrea Ivaldi, which Italy won the tournament. He also call-up to 2003–04 Four Nations Tournament (between Switzerland, Germany and Austria) first match against Switzerland U20 team, behind Emanuele Bianchi as backup. In the next 5 matches of the tournament, he never received any call-up again, as the coach has tested Tommaso Berni (already played for U21 in 2002), Mario Cassano, Bianchi, Alfonso De Lucia, Francesco Scotti, Davide Capello and Paolo Comi in the U21 feeder team. Due to club performance, he never received U21 call-up.

References

External links
 Profile at FIGC 
 Profile at AIC.Football.it 
 
 
 Marco Paoloni, il portiere che narcotizzava i compagni

1984 births
Living people
People from Civitavecchia
Italian footballers
Italy youth international footballers
Serie B players
Serie C players
A.S. Roma players
S.S. Teramo Calcio players
Ternana Calcio players
Ascoli Calcio 1898 F.C. players
U.S. Cremonese players
Benevento Calcio players
Association football goalkeepers
Footballers from Lazio
Sportspeople from the Metropolitan City of Rome Capital